Hoynat Islet ( Perşembe Islet ) is a Turkish islet in the Black Sea.

Administratively it is a part of Perşembe ilçe (district) of Ordu Province.

Historically the uninhabited islet was a hideout and storage location of the sailors. Now the island is known as the main reproduction area of the European shags in Turkey.

References

Islands of Turkey
Islands of Ordu Province
Islands of the Black Sea